Agyphantes is a genus of Asian dwarf spiders that was first described by Michael I. Saaristo & Y. M. Marusik in 2004.  it contains only two species: A. sajanensis and A. sakhalinensis.

See also
 List of Linyphiidae species

References

Araneomorphae genera
Linyphiidae
Spiders of Russia
Taxa named by Michael Saaristo